Hamilton, Ontario, Canada, has become a popular destination for the television and film industry, attracting dozens of film and television productions each year.

Hamilton has steadily grown as a filming location due in part to the existence of a regional tax incentive.

Prominent Hollywood actors who have filmed in Hamilton include: Don Cheadle, Jeff Daniels, Michael Keaton, Harvey Keitel, Eugene Levy, Dolph Lundgren, Shirley MacLaine, Michael Madsen, Steve Martin, Edward Norton, Chris O'Donnell, Michelle Pfeiffer, Christopher Plummer, Randy Quaid, Tim Roth, Martin Sheen, John Travolta, Mark Wahlberg, Christopher Walken, Elliot Page, Sigourney Weaver, Kevin Spacey, Kelly Preston and Robin Williams.

In 2007 the city launched a new ad campaign called "HAMILTON: FILM, Why Shoot Anywhere Else?" Awards have been received from the Association of Film Commissioners International and the Economic Development Association of Canada. Hamilton has a dedicated office geared towards assisting those in the film and music industry.

Film & culture activity

Hamilton's contributions

Local TV station CHCH introduced Canadians to Smith & Smith, which featured Steve and Morag Smith (the former better known from his stint as Red Green). The Hilarious House of Frightenstein was a Canadian children's television series which was also produced by CHCH in 1971. It was syndicated to television stations across Canada and the United States, and occasionally still appears today in some TV markets. The show's cast included Billy Van, Fishka Rais, Guy Big, Mitch Markowitz, Vincent Price, and Julius Sumner Miller. One hundred and thirty episodes of the series were made in a nine-month span starting in 1971. Don Cherry's Grapevine began airing on CHCH TV in the 1980s and shot on location at CHCH TV's Telecentre on King Street West and then at CHCH's main studio on Jackson Street West. The production then moved (including the original set and bar) to the restaurant Cherry had in town, also called "Don Cherry's Grapevine". The restaurant was on Main Street East. CHCH also produced local broadcasts such as Tiny Talent Time and Party Game.

Power Play was a Canadian television drama series that aired on CTV from 1998 to 2000. The show starred Michael Riley as Brett Parker, a former New York City sports agent who became the general manager of a (fictional) National Hockey League franchise, the Hamilton Steelheads.

A number of Hamiltonians played a part in the early development of Hollywood, including Jean Adair (1873–1953), Julia Arthur (1868–1959), Douglass Dumbrille (1889–1974), and Florence Lawrence (1890–1938) who was a silent film actress and often referred to as "Hollywood's First Movie Star". She was also known as "The Biograph Girl" and "The Girl of a Thousand Faces". During her lifetime, Lawrence appeared in more than 270 films for various motion picture companies. Del Lord (Grimsby, Ontario) was an early Hollywood film director and actor, best known as a director of Three Stooges films. Interested in the theatre, he travelled to New York City; when fellow Canadian Mack Sennett offered him a job at his new Keystone Studios, Lord went on to work in Hollywood, California. There he played the driver of the Keystone Kops police van, appearing in several of the successful films.

Modern-day contributions to Hollywood by Hamiltonians include SCTV alumni Eugene Levy, Martin Short, and Dave Thomas. All three attended McMaster University along with John Candy in the 1970s.  Well-known movie directors and producers in Hollywood from Hamilton are Daniel Goldberg (Space Jam, Twins) and Slovakian-born, Canadian-raised Ivan Reitman. Reitman is most remembered for directing and producing a string of comedies, mostly in the 1980s and 1990s (Meatballs, Stripes and Ghostbusters). Reitman is also a founder of the McMaster Film Board at McMaster University. Reitman and Goldberg have worked together in the past on a number of film productions and continue to work together today as partners in the production company Northern Lights Entertainment. Others include Kathleen Robertson, best known for her work on 90210(1994–1997) and 2002 crime film Torso: The Evelyn Dick Story and Stana Katic best known for her role as Detective Kate Beckett on ABC's Castle.

Production locations
Many of the streets of Hamilton are used for a number TV/ film shoots. Some examples of these are listed below:

In 1999, Detroit Rock City, starring the rock group Kiss, was filmed at the Copps Coliseum arena on Bay Street North. In 2004, Copps Coliseum was used again to film Meg Ryan's Against the Ropes.

In 2000, LIUNA Station reopened the James Street North Canadian National rail station as a banquet hall. In 1996 the station was used for the most expensive film ever made in Canada to that time, The Long Kiss Goodnight, which cost US$$95,000,000 to make and starred Samuel L. Jackson. Also in 2000, X-Men, featuring Hugh Jackman and Patrick Stewart, shot some of its scenes at LIUNA Station. Also that year, parts of Sean Connery's Finding Forrester was filmed inside the gymnasium of Cathedral Secondary School on King Street East and Copps Coliseum arena stands in for Madison Square Garden in the film.

In 2001, the Steven Seagal film Exit Wounds used the streets of Downtown Hamilton for a period of six weeks for a night shoot of the movie's climatic chase scene that features the Gore Park water fountain and the Hamilton GO Transit station (the original site of the Toronto, Hamilton and Buffalo Railway from 1892 to 1987). At the same time, around the corner, the second unit was shooting a rapid-fire car crash involving a motorcycle, a car, and a couple of dumpsters. Downtown Hamilton had been invaded by the cast and crews of "Exit Wounds," but no one seemed to mind and even though it was the middle of the night, a huge crowd was on hand to cheer the performers on.

In 2005, zombie movie Resident Evil: Apocalypse was partly filmed at the Hamilton Cemetery on York Boulevard, across the street from Dundurn Castle and Dundurn Park. Also in 2005 the Mark Wahlberg film Four Brothers was filmed mostly in Hamilton's North End neighborhoods, north of the Canadian National Railway lines, and featured Stelco and Dofasco's steel mills as a backdrop. Also that year Ron Howard's Cinderella Man starring Russell Crowe filmed the dock workers scene on the boardwalks of one of the piers of Hamilton Harbour.

For the 2006 movie Man of the Year, starring Robin Williams and Christopher Walken, some scenes were shot throughout Dundas, Ontario and most of Downtown Hamilton.

In 2006, the Disney film Firehouse Dog was filmed at the old Westinghouse headquarters building (1903–1997), on Wentworth Street North, (entrance one block east on Sanford Avenue) which featured the firehouse dog jumping off the roof of the burning building.

In 2007, the film The Incredible Hulk was filmed on Main Street East — a two-week night shoot that featured the film's climactic fight scene between the Hulk and Abomination. Temporary buildings were erected by the film's crew on parking lots behind the Royal Connaught Hotel building on the north side of Main as well as across the street on the southwest corner of Main and John Streets. The streets of Hamilton were made to look like Harlem, New York. The film was released in June 2008.

Dundas, Ontario
The DeLuxe Restaurant was a nostalgic 1950s-style diner found on King Street (Dundas), used primarily for film shoots. A number of feature films and television productions have been shot there in Dundas. In 2006 the NBC television serial drama, The West Wing, directed by Christopher Misiano and starring Jimmy Smits and Bradley Whitford was shot here at this location.

Also in 2006, Man of the Year, a political thriller/comedy movie directed by Barry Levinson and featuring Robin Williams and Christopher Walken was shot here. As well, Molly: An American Girl on the Home Front, the third movie in The American Girl Movie Collection, tagged as a Disney Channel Original Movie was shot here. It was directed by Joyce Chopra and stars Molly Ringwald.

In 2007, parts of Closing the Ring, a film directed by Richard Attenborough and starring Shirley MacLaine, Christopher Plummer and Neve Campbell was shot in Dundas and at the DeLuxe Restaurant. Also in 2007, CIBC Bank used the restaurant for a TV commercial shoot.  After years of sitting closed and serving the film industry on occasion, the DeLuxe Restaurant underwent extensive renovations and opened as Thai restaurant Bangkok Spoon in 2009.

All of the "Good Witch" films were filmed in and around Dundas.

Film studios

Founded in 2007, Digital Canaries began as a film production company.  In 2015, they pivoted, no longer creating their own productions, they instead began creating "a filmmaker’s playground".  Focused on serving the needs of the film, TV, and indie media production industries, they now specialize in hard-to-find and harder-to-shoot locations. As of 2021, Digital Canaries is operating six separate and unique filming locations. Five of these locations are Hamilton-based including a 100,000sqft warehouse containing various film locations and standing sets, a bar with upstairs apartment and large patio, a full size banquet hall, and two school properties. Dundas is home to Digital Canaries’ remaining location: a farmhouse containing abandoned house sets, dark tunnels, apocalyptic looking land and more. Digital Canaries’ standing sets include hospital rooms/hallways, a pharmacy, morgue, police bullpen, evidence locker, jail cells, interrogation room, bar set, apartment, news anchor set, offices and more. Digital Canaries also operates a prophouse with over a million items and counting including furniture, kitchenware, shop/industrial props, medical equipment/tools, military gear, various decor, and more. Planes, Jets, and related props are a specialty of Digital Canaries; their warehouse is currently home to a Boeing 727 with 30’ fuselage and full cockpit, Falcon 10 jet, Falcon 20 jet, and a flight simulator. In addition to their prophouse they also have a wide variety of wardrobe options ranging from casual wear, evening dress, and wedding attire,  to first responder uniforms, and continuity wardrobe. Owned and operated by CEO Simon Winterson and backed by a small but dedicated team of employees, Digital Canaries continues to work towards growing Hamilton's TV and film industry.

In March 2008, a brand new film studio opened up on 525 Parkdale Avenue North called, Steel Work Studios. It was supposed to be a full service film studio with 13 departments to meet the needs of the TV and film industry which included a talent agency for extras and talent called, 'Cast In Steel.'. The group involved with Steel Work Studios were very optimistic about the studio noting that in 2007 TV and film was a $1-billion industry in Ontario and 40% of that was in Hamilton, Ontario. Three months later the facility closed down and no official word was given for its closure.

In recent years there has been talk of converting the  facility on Victoria Avenue North that was one time home of the Otis Elevator Company and Studebaker plant into a Mega-Film Studio. In 2004 a group of local investors were ready to open up the $30-million facility named Hamilton Film Studios but pulled out two months after it opened up. One of the main reasons was they overestimated the appeal of the site, in that the interior had too many support beams, making the space impractical for productions requiring wide, uninterrupted expanses.

In 2018, the NUVO Network opened its 150,000 square foot facility consisting of 
three state-of-the-art media production studios, podcasting facilities, recording and vlogging studios, alongside editing suites, office spaces, and events venue.

In December 2019, Hamilton Film Studios (commonly known as HFS) was opened at 400 Wellington St. North in downtown Hamilton by friends and filmmakers Zach Zohr, Graham Purdy and Ken Woychesko.  The studio supports all film from Hollywood productions to indie movies, music videos to commercials. HFS also has a location in Dundas, a retail store in Hamilton (which caters to filmmakers) and an abundance of top notch rental gear and location support.  It has helped to reinvigorate the film scene in Hamilton and has been praised for inserting a true film vendor in the city.

Film list 
The following is a partial list of films and television programs shot in Hamilton, Ontario, and their release dates: 

 Hailey's Gift (1977 Family); Barry Morse, Kate Parr
 Strange Brew (1983); Rick Moranis, Dave Thomas
 Youngblood (1986); Rob Lowe, Patrick Swayze, Keanu Reeves
 Hearts of Fire (1987); Bob Dylan
 Amerika (1987 TV mini series)
 Bionic Showdown: The Six Million Dollar Man and The Bionic Woman (1989); Lee Majors
 The Cutting Edge (1992); D. B. Sweeney, Moira Kelly
 The Air Up There (1994); Kevin Bacon
 Camilla (1994); Bridget Fonda, Jessica Tandy
 Canadian Bacon (1995); Alan Alda, John Candy
 The Long Kiss Goodnight (1996); Samuel L. Jackson
 "Power Play" (1998–2000 TV series); Michael Riley
 The Big Hit (1998); Mark Wahlberg, Lou Diamond Phillips
 Detroit Rock City (1999); Rock group KISS
 New Jersey Turnpikes (1999); Kelsey Grammer
 The Third Miracle (1999 Drama); Ed Harris
 The Time Shifters (1999 TV Sci-Fi/Action); Casper Van Dien
 Daydream Believers: The Monkees Story (2000)
 Gone in 60 Seconds (2000); Nicolas Cage, Robert Duvall, Angelina Jolie
 Rated X (2000); Charlie Sheen, Emilio Estevez
 X-Men (2000); Hugh Jackman, Patrick Stewart
 Finding Forrester (2000); Sean Connery
 Laughter on the 23rd Floor (2001 TV Comedy); Nathan Lane
 Brian's Song (2001 TV movie)
 Exit Wounds (2001); Steven Seagal
 Glitter (2001); Mariah Carey
 Sins of the Father (2002 docudrama), Tom Sizemore, Richard Jenkins
 Our America (2002 TV Drama); Vanessa A. Williams
 John Q (2002); Denzel Washington
 Avenging Angelo (2002); Sylvester Stallone
 Death to Smoochy (2002); Robin Williams
 Global Heresy (2002); Peter O'Toole
 RFK (2002 TV Drama); Linus Roache
 Second String (2002 TV Comedy/Drama); Jon Voight
 The Limit (2003 Crime Drama); Lauren Bacall, Henry Czerny
 Wrong Turn (2003); Desmond Harrington
 Bulletproof Monk (2003); Chow Yun-Fat
 How to Deal (2003); Mandy Moore
 Spinning Boris (2003); Jeff Goldblum, Anthony LaPaglia
 Direct Action (2004); Dolph Lundgren
 Saint Ralph (2004); Adam Butcher
 Prom Queen: The Marc Hall Story (2004 TV movie)
 Against the Ropes (2004); Meg Ryan
 Resident Evil: Apocalypse (2004); Milla Jovovich
 The Confessor (aka: The Good Shepherd) (2004); Christian Slater
 Land of the Dead (2005); Dennis Hopper
 The Man (2005) Samuel L. Jackson, Eugene Levy
 Cinderella Man (2005) Russell Crowe, Renée Zellweger
 Zoom (2005); Tim Allen, Courteney Cox
 Riding the Bus with My Sister (2005); Rosie O'Donnell
 Four Brothers (2005); Mark Wahlberg
 Cheaper by the Dozen 2 (2005); Steve Martin, Bonnie Hunt
 Lie with Me (2005 Drama/Romance); Lauren Lee Smith, Eric Balfour
 Terry (2005 TV Movie); Shawn Ashmore
 Swarmed (2005 TV Movie); Michael Shanks
 Plague City: SARS in Toronto (2005 TV movie)
 Solar Attack (2005 Sci-Fi/Thriller); Louis Gossett Jr.
 Shades of Black: The Conrad Black Story (2006 TV Drama); Jason Priestley
 The Last Sect (2006); David Carradine
 It's a Boy Girl Thing (2006 Comedy/Romance); Samaire Armstrong, Kevin Zegers
 Man of the Year (2006); Robin Williams, Christopher Walken
 Silent Hill (2006); Radha Mitchell, Sean Bean
 The Path to 9/11 (2006 TV Movie); Harvey Keitel
 Firehouse Dog (2006 Disney); Bruce Greenwood
 Snow Cake (2006); Sigourney Weaver
 Away from Her (2006); Julie Christie, Gordon Pinsent
 The War at Home (2006 TV series); Rob Lotterstein
 American Pie Presents: The Naked Mile (2006 Universal)
 Skinwalkers (2006); Jason Behr
 UKM: The Ultimate Killing Machine (2006 Horror); Michael Madsen
 "The Tracey Fragments" (2007 Drama); Elliot Page
 The Four Horsemen (2007)
 American Pie Presents: Beta House (2007 Comedy); John White, Steve Talley
 Hairspray (2007 Musical); John Travolta, Michelle Pfeiffer
 Talk to Me (2007 Bio-drama); Don Cheadle, Martin Sheen
 Pigs (2007 Comedy/Drama); Jefferson Brown, Darryn Lucio
 Final Draft (2007 Horror); James Van Der Beek, Darryn Lucio
 Weirdsville (2007 Comedy/drama); Matt Frewer
 Closing the Ring (2007); Christopher Plummer, Shirley MacLaine
 Final Draft (2007); Jeff Roop
 Left for Dead (2007 Horror); Steve Byers
 The Poet (2007 Drama); Jonathan Scarfe
 The Company (2007 TV Drama/Thriller mini-series); Michael Keaton, Chris O'Donnell, Alfred Molina
 The Incredible Hulk (2008 Action/Drama/Sci-Fi); Edward Norton, Tim Roth
 Flash of Genius (2008); Greg Kinnear
 Traitor (2008 Drama); Jeff Daniels, Don Cheadle
 XIII (2008 Action, TV mini-series); Val Kilmer, Stephen Dorff
 Right Hand Man (2008 Crime, TV); Joe Mantegna
 Weapon (2008 Action); Bruce Greenwood
 The Time Traveler's Wife (2008 Sci-Fi/ Romance); Eric Bana, Rachel McAdams
 Splice (2009 Sci-Fi); Sarah Polley, Adrien Brody
 The Summit (2008 TV Drama/ Thriller mini-series); Christopher Plummer, Wendy Crewson
 The Good Witch (2008 TV Family); It starred Catherine Bell and Chris Potter.
 Max Payne (2008 Action Thriller); Mark Wahlberg, Beau Bridges, Chris O'Donnell, Mila Kunis
 Real Time (2008 Comedy/drama); Randy Quaid
 The Last Hit Man (2008 Crime); Joe Mantegna, Elizabeth Whitmere
 Amelia (2009 Drama); Hilary Swank, Richard Gere
 Repo Men (2009 Sci-Fi Thriller); Jude Law, Forest Whitaker
 Defendor (2009 Comedy/Drama); Woody Harrelson, Elias Koteas
 The Boondock Saints II: All Saints Day (2009 Action/Comedy); Sean Patrick Flanery, Norman Reedus
 Kick-Ass (2009 Action Comedy); Nicolas Cage, Aaron Johnson
 You Might as Well Live (2009 Comedy); Joshua Peace, Michael Madsen
 The Con Artist (2010); Sarah Roemer
 Casino Jack (2010); Kevin Spacey, Rachelle Lefevre
 Resident Evil: Retribution (2011); Milla Jovovich
 Red Lights (2012 Drama/Horror/Thriller); Robert De Niro, Cillian Murphy
 Jesus Henry Christ (2012 Comedy); Toni Collette, Michael Sheen
 Mama (2013 Horror); Jessica Chastain, Nikolaj Coster-Waldau
 The Mortal Instruments: City of Bones (2013 film); Lily Collins
 Kick-Ass 2 (2013) Superhero, Action, Comedy; Aaron Johnson, Chloë Grace Moretz, Christopher Mintz-Plasse, Jim Carrey
 RoboCop (2014)
 Crimson Peak (2015); Tom Hiddleston, Charlie Hunnam
 Pixels (2015); Adam Sandler, Peter Dinklage, Josh Gad
 It (2017 film) (2017); Jaeden Lieberher, Bill Skarsgård
 xXx: The Return of Xander Cage (2017); Vin Diesel, Donnie Yen, Ruby Rose
 The Shape of Water (film) (2017); Sally Hawkins, Michael Shannon, Richard Jenkins
 Taken (2017–present); Clive Standen, Gaius Charles, Brooklyn Sudano
 The Handmaid's Tale (TV series) (2017–present); Elisabeth Moss, Joseph Fiennes, Yvonne Strahovski
 The Umbrella Academy (TV series) (2019-present); Elliot Page, Tom Hopper, Colm Feore
 Chucky  (TV series) (2021-present); Zackary Arthur, Brad Dourif, Jennifer Tilly

Images

References

External links
Internet Movie DataBase: Listing of TV/ Film Productions shot in Hamilton, Ontario
Hamilton Film Office

History of Hamilton, Ontario
Economy of Hamilton, Ontario
Cinema of Ontario
Hamilton